Route 62, also known as Liam Hickey Drive, is a very short access road which connects the Trans-Canada Highway at an interchange with the town of Holyrood.

Before 2018, it was called Holyrood Access Road.

Route description

Route 62 begins at an interchange with Route 1 (Trans Canada Highway, Exit 36) near Butter Pot Provincial Park. It heads north through rural wooded areas to enter the town limits and pass by IBEW College. The highway continues north to pass by a golf course and a few other businesses before entering downtown, where Route 62 comes to an end at an intersection with Route 60 (Conception Bay Highway).

Major intersections

See also

List of highways numbered 62

References

062